Krzesiński is a Polish masculine surname, its feminine counterpart is Krzesińska. It may refer to
Adam Krzesiński (born 1965), Polish fencer
Elżbieta Krzesińska (1934–2015), Polish long jumper
Mathilde Kschessinska (1872–1971), Russian ballerina
Stanisław Krzesiński (born 1950), Polish wrestler
Silvio Krzesinski (born 1971), Empresário

See also 
Krzesin Landscape Park

Polish-language surnames